Buckinghamshire is a ceremonial county in southeast England.

Buckinghamshire may also refer to:
Buckinghamshire, a former County of Lower Canada divided in 93 townships in 1792
Buckinghamshire (UK Parliament constituency), a former United Kingdom Parliamentary constituency, 1707–1885
South Buckinghamshire (UK Parliament constituency), a former County constituency and a division of the Administrative County of Buckinghamshire, 1950–1974